State Road 50 (NM 50) is a state highway in the US state of New Mexico. NM 50's western terminus is in the village of Glorieta at Interstate 25 (I-25), U.S. Route 84 (US 84) and US 85 and the  eastern terminus is in the village of Pecos at NM 63 and NM 223.

Major intersections

See also

References

050
Transportation in San Miguel County, New Mexico
Transportation in Santa Fe County, New Mexico